Tenerife North–Ciudad de La Laguna Airport , formerly Los Rodeos Airport, is the smaller of the two international airports on the island of Tenerife, Spain. It handled 3,717,944 passengers in 2012. Combined with Tenerife South Airport, the island gathers the highest passenger movement of all the Canary Islands, with 12,248,673 passengers, surpassing Gran Canaria Airport. Today TFN is an inter-island hub connecting all seven of the main Canary Islands with connections to the Iberian Peninsula and Europe.

In 1977, the airport was the infamous site of the deadliest accident in aviation history, when two Boeing 747s collided on the runway in heavy fog conditions, causing the deaths of 583 passengers and crew.

History

Early years
Many years before the airport had even been built, the field at Los Rodeos was hastily prepared to accommodate the first (though unofficial) flight into Tenerife operated by an Arado V I (D-1594) aircraft operating from Berlin on behalf of Deutsche Luft Hansa.

In May 1930, the Compañía de Líneas Aéreas Subvencionadas S.A. (C.L.A.S.S.A.) established the first air link between the Spanish mainland and the Canary Islands using a Ford 4-AT Trimotor (M-CKKA), which took off from Getafe, Madrid to the Los Rodeos field via Casablanca, Cape Juby and Gando in Gran Canaria.

After the final location of the airport had been decided, funds were gathered between 1935 and 1939 to build a small hangar and begin expanding the airstrip which would become Los Rodeos. 

Operations into Los Rodeos recommenced on 23 January 1941 with a De Havilland DH89A Dragon Rapide operating an Iberia flight from Gando in Gran Canaria. By 1946, more hangars, a passenger terminal and an  paved runway had been built, and the airport was officially opened to all national and international traffic.

Development since the 1960s
In 1971, with the prospect of the Boeing 747 flying into the airport, the runway was reinforced and an ILS (Instrument Landing System) was installed.

A new airport, Tenerife South Airport, was inaugurated on 6 November 1978, in response to the 1977 Tenerife airport disaster which resulted in the highest number of fatalities (excluding ground fatalities) of any single accident in aviation history. The south airport is situated at sea level to avert the occurrence of fog, one of the reasons for the crash.

On 25 April 1980, Dan-Air Flight 1008 Boeing 727 crashed near the airport, killing all 146 on board, in a controlled flight into terrain accident. 

A new terminal was opened at Tenerife North Airport in 2002, comprising car park, motorway access ramps, and four-story terminal building, with 12 gates. In February 2003, Santa Bárbara Airlines transferred its Caracas service from Reina Sofía Airport to Tenerife North. An inter-island domestic area was opened in 2005.

Using Airbus A330s, Air Europa introduced a direct route to Miami in June 2009. The airline initially intended to end the link in October. Before the maiden flight, however, Air Europa stated the service would run until January due to high demand. In late 2009, the company decided to make the flight permanent. Following a pause for aircraft maintenance, the carrier resumed services to Miami in June 2010. The route would operate every summer, and the last flight of the season took place in October. Nevertheless, the carrier then discontinued the link.

Amid economic troubles in Venezuela, SBA Airlines, formerly known as Santa Bárbara Airlines, terminated its flights to Caracas in February 2014. Four years later, Plus Ultra Líneas Aéreas began flying the same route with Airbus A340s.

Airlines and destinations

The following airlines operate regular scheduled and charter flights to and from Tenerife North:

Statistics

Accidents and incidents

Tenerife airport disaster

On 27 March 1977, Tenerife North Airport (then Tenerife Los Rodeos) was the scene of the deadliest accident in aviation history, which claimed the lives of 583 people. While attempting to take off, KLM Flight 4805, a Boeing 747-206B, collided with Pan Am Flight 1736, a Boeing 747-121, which was taxiing along the runway. All 248 passengers and crew on the KLM flight were killed, along with 335 occupants of the Pan Am flight; however, 61 of the passengers and crew on board the Pan Am survived. Neither of the two airliners was originally scheduled to land on Tenerife, as both flights were bound for Gran Canaria Airport but had been diverted to Los Rodeos as a result of a terrorist bombing at Gran Canaria.

Other incidents

Ground transport
Bus routes 20, 30, 103 and 343 serve the airport.

References

External links

Official website 
Airlines Pilot Association (ALPA) Article on 1977 KLM-PanAm disaster

Airports in the Canary Islands
Buildings and structures in Tenerife
Transport in Tenerife
Airports established in 1930